Krish (க்ரிஷ்) is an Indian film director who works in the Tamil film industry. He made his directorial debut with Zhagaram, Which has been made on a budget of Rs 10 lakh.

Filmography

Director

Producer
DESANTHIRI PRODUCTIONS is an Indian Film Production Company, founded by Krish.

References

External links 
 
Official Official Facebook
Official Official Twitter

Tamil-language film directors
Living people
People from Kanyakumari district
People from Nagercoil
Year of birth missing (living people)